Katie Brown (born 1981) is an American female rock climber who has made notable ascents in sport climbing, trad, and bouldering.

She began sport climbing in Kentucky at the age of 13, and in 1995 at age 14 she won the X Games and a climbing Junior World Championship in Laval.  In 1996 and 1997 she won both the Rock Master in Arco, Italy as well as the X Games.  In 1999 she clinched a World Cup victory in France.

In October 2008, she completed an onsight (free-climbing without knowledge of the route) of the northwest face of Yosemite National Park's Half Dome, and, along with climber Lynn Hill, the first female free ascent of the Leaning Tower.

Brown was selected as one of the 2009 Hot 20 under 40 by 7x7SF Magazine, and is the author of the book Girl on the Rocks: A Woman's Guide to Climbing with Strength, Grace, and Courage.  Around the same time she was featured in a Citibank ThankYou Card commercial along with Alex Honnold, climbing Fisher Towers near Moab, Utah.  She also appeared in Rolling Stone and The New York Times.

She was once described by former world champion Lynn Hill as "the best female climber in the history of the sport."

She left the sport behind and has lived in the Boulder, Colorado area.  In 2007 she started a newspaper column about climbing for the Boulder Daily Camera and is currently working on a memoir.

On October 11, 2022, she released the book Unraveled: A Climber’s Journey Through Darkness and Back detailing her struggles and the fallout of her time as a prodigy.

References

External links
 IFSC profile

Living people
American rock climbers
American female climbers
American sportswomen
X Games athletes
1981 births
21st-century American women